Zoltán Kovács  (16 December 1986 − 27 August 2013) was a Hungarian football player.

References

1986 births
2013 deaths
Footballers from Budapest
Hungarian footballers
Association football defenders
Budapest Honvéd FC players
Győri ETO FC players
Rákospalotai EAC footballers
Nyíregyháza Spartacus FC players
Vecsés FC footballers